The 1967–68 DDR-Oberliga season was the 20th season of the DDR-Oberliga, the top level of ice hockey in East Germany. Eight teams participated in the league, and SC Dynamo Berlin won the championship.

Regular season

References

External links
East German results 1949-1970

DDR-Oberliga (ice hockey) seasons
Ober
Ger
1967 in East German sport
1968 in East German sport